Anandamanandamaye is a 2004 Indian Telugu-language romantic comedy drama film in Telugu directed by Srinu Vaitla and produced by Ramoji Rao. It was released on 5 February 2004 under the banner of Ushakiran Movies. The film featured  Akash and Renuka Menon, J. D. Chakravarthy, Preeti Jhangiani, Venu Madhav and M. S. Narayana. Background score and soundtrack were composed by Koti.

Cast 

  Akash as Kiran 
 Renuka Menon as Bhuvaneshwari "Bhuvana"
 J. D. Chakravarthy as Chakravarti "Chakri"
 Preeti Jhangiani as Maheshwari "Mahi"
 Devan as Bhuvana's father
 Sumalatha as Bhuvana's maternal aunt
 Sudhakar as Bullebbayi
 Sivaji Raja as Bhuvana's paternal uncle
 Sumithra as Bhuvana's mother
 Rajya Lakshmi as Bullebbayi's wife
 Hema as Bhuvana's aunt
 A. V. S.
 Venu Madhav as Ammi Raju
 M. S. Narayana as Gavarraju
 Sunil as "Panchatantram" Seenu
 Dharmavarapu Subramanyam as Manmatha Rao
 Kondavalasa Lakshmana Rao as Lakshmana Rao
 Nutan Prasad as Judge
 Banerjee as lawyer
 Gautam Raju as T. C.
 Jenny
 Jaya Prakash Reddy as Police Inspector
 Melkote
 Sudeepa Pinky as Bhuvana's cousin
 Baby Zeeba as Bhuvana's cousin
 Master Bharath as Bhuvana's cousin

Production 
After the success of Anandam (2002), Srinu Vaitla, Ramoji Rao, and Akash collaborated again for this film.

Music 
The background score and soundtrack were composed by Koti, with lyrics by Sirivennela Seetharama Sastry, Veturi, Sai Sriharsha, and Kandi Konda. The singers were Sreerama Chandra, Sunitha, Karthik, Raghu Kunche, Malathi, Shreya Ghoshal and Koti.

Release 
A critic from Sify  opined that "A feel-good family drama about mistaken identities similar to Chitchor and the recent Main Prem Ki Deewani Hoon. Director Seenu Vytla has handled the subject with streaks of comedy and has been successful to some extent but the flashbacks are too lengthy and on the whole the film is far from entertaining". Jeevi of Idlebrain gave the film a rating of three out of five and opined that "This film is a typical feel-good movie".

References 

2000s Telugu-language films
2004 films
Films directed by Srinu Vaitla
Films scored by Koti